Giovanni Pandozzi (Lenola, Province of Latina, 1711–1790) was an Italian painter.

Biography
He was initially a pupil of Paolo De Matteis and then of Sebastiano Conca. Once Conca died, he moved to back to Lenola. He worked for the Church of Santa Chiara in Naples. There he painted in the choir of the monks and two altarpieces: one of Santa Chiara praying for the Edification of the Church and The Holy Eucharist being adored by Franciscan Saints.

He also painted works for the towns of Pico, Itri, Pastena, and Campodimele.

References

1711 births
1790 deaths
18th-century Italian painters
Italian male painters
Painters from Naples
People from the Province of Latina
18th-century Italian male artists